Hércules Pereira do Nascimento (born 20 October 2000), simply known as Hércules, is a Brazilian professional footballer who plays as a midfielder for Fortaleza.

Club career
Born in Jaicós, Piauí, Hércules began his career with São Bernardo in 2016, staying eight months at the club before opting to leave due to homesickness. In 2019, Hércules played for the under-20 side of Tiradentes-CE before making his senior debut on 1 June 2019, in a 1–2 Campeonato Cearense Segunda Divisão away loss against Crato. Later in the year, he joined Atlético Cearense and returned to the youth setup.

Hércules was loaned to Crato in October 2020, helping in the club's promotion from the second level. Upon returning to Atlético Cearense, he became a regular starter, impressing during the 2021 Cearense.

On 28 May 2021, Hércules signed for Fortaleza on loan until the end of the year, and was initially assigned to the under-23 side. In December, the club paid R$ 200,000 for 50% of his economic rights, and he agreed to a permanent contract until December 2024.

Hércules made his first team debut for Fortaleza on 24 February 2022, coming on as a late substitute for Juninho Capixaba in a 1–0 home win over Pacajus. He scored his first professional goal on 3 March, netting his side's fifth in a 5–0 away routing of the same opponent.

Hércules made his Série A debut on 10 April 2022, replacing Matheus Jussa in a 0–1 home loss against Cuiabá.

Career statistics

Honours
Fortaleza
Copa do Nordeste: 2022
Campeonato Cearense: 2022

References

External links
Fortaleza profile 

2000 births
Living people
Sportspeople from Piauí
Brazilian footballers
Association football midfielders
Campeonato Brasileiro Série A players
Associação Esportiva Tiradentes players
FC Atlético Cearense players
Crato Esporte Clube players
Fortaleza Esporte Clube players